Felice Cerruti Bauduc (1818 – November 24, 1896) was an Italian artist born in Turin. He is known mainly for his genre paintings, military scenes and Orientalist subject matter. Some books on Orientalist art give his name as Felice Cerruti Beauduc.

Life and career
Born in Turin in 1818 by Francesco, he was the son of Giacinta Cicero. After completing his studies in veterinary science at Fossano, Felice Cerruti Bauduc was engaged in the Italian War of Independence, 1840-1850. He subsequently decided to try and earn a living from painting and studied with Horace de Vernet who specialised in military scenes, many inspired by North Africa.  His early work often featured militarist themes, such as his Battle with Solferino and San Martino while another painting depicted an episode of the Battle of Goito.

In the later years of his career he turned his attention to Orientalist subject matter such as Arab Caravan (1875) and Fantasia arabe (1884).

Two of his large oil paintings, featuring Arab fantasies are on display at the Gallery of Modern Art in Turin.

Work 
He worked primarily in oil on large canvases. His painting Pastori Nella Campagna Romana sold November 29, 1993.

Select list of paintings
 Battaglia di Goito (Battle of Goito) n.d.
 Sommacampagna, 1848 
 Un Momento della Battaglia di Pastrengo (Scene from the Battle of Pastengo), 1855
 Scontro di Volta Mantovana, (Battle of Volta Mantovana) 1858
 La Tempe d'Edfou n.d. 
 Caravan Arabe (Arab Caravan), 1875
 Fantasia arabe (Arabian Fantasy), 1874

Gallery

See also
 List of Orientalist artists
 Orientalism

References

1818 births
1896 deaths
19th-century Italian painters
Italian male painters
Orientalist painters
19th-century Italian male artists